STF may refer to:

Concepts
 Spread tow fabric (stf), a type of lightweight fabric
 Smooth Trans Focus (STF), technology in photographic lenses that produces a smooth focus effect
 STF function, an autobracketing function on certain cameras that emulates a Smooth Trans Focus effect
 Short-time fasting (STF), medical term

Organisations
 She's the First, an organization that fights gender inequality
 Songahm Taekwondo Federation, the South American branch of the American Taekwondo Association
 Supreme Federal Court, Brazil's supreme court
 Svenska Turistföreningen, the Swedish Tourist Association

Special task forces

 Special Task Force (SAPS), a South African Counter-Terrorist force
 Special Task Force (Sri Lanka), Sri Lankan Police Counter-Terrorist force
 Special Task Force (India), an Indian Counter-Terrorist force

Other uses
 George M. Bryan Airport (FAA location identifier: STF) of Starkville, Mississippi
 Shear thickening fluid, a type of smart material whose viscosity increases as shear stress increases
 Stepover Toehold Facelock, a submission hold used in professional wrestling
  Common Occupational Injuries often result from accidents known as Slips, Trips and Falls